The celestial crown is a modified version of the Eastern crown. The celestial crown is a representative badge or headdress consisting of a gold fence usually adorned with pointed points or rays topped with stars of the same metal. It usually has eight points, five in the representations that are not in relief, although the number of these is variable.

The celestial crown appears in some Catholic representations of the Virgin Mary and is also used in heraldry.

The celestial crown has longer spikes than the Eastern crown.

Gallery

See also
Crown (heraldry)
Heraldry
Circlet
Golden hat
Crown of Immortality
Circle of stars
Astral crown

References

 Celestial Crown definition. Libro de Armoría.
Heraldic crowns, www.scottish-wedding-dreams.com
Fox-Davies, Arthur Charles (1909) A Complete Guide to Heraldry, Chapter XXIII: Crest, Coronets and Chapeaux.

Eastern
Crowns in heraldry

Crowns of the coat of Arms of Austria-Hungary